Ronald Peart (8 March 1920 – 1999) was an English professional footballer who played as a half-back in the Football League for Derby County and York City, in non-League football for Langley Moor and Spennymoor United, and was on the books of Hartlepools United without making a league appearance.

References

1920 births
1999 deaths
People from Brandon, Lincolnshire
Footballers from Lincolnshire
English footballers
Association football midfielders
Hartlepool United F.C. players
Derby County F.C. players
York City F.C. players
Spennymoor United F.C. players
English Football League players